Route 211, also known as English Harbour East Road, is a  east–west highway on the Burin Peninsula of the island of Newfoundland in the province of Newfoundland and Labrador. It connects the communities of English Harbour East, Grand le Pierre, and Terrenceville with Route 210 (Heritage Run/Burin Peninsula Highway).

Route description

Route 211 begins at a fork in the road it the centre of town in English Harbour East. It winds its way northwest through neighbourhoods before leaving town and heading northeast through rural and barren terrain for several kilometres. The highway makes a dip to the south to pass through Grand Le Pierre before heading inland for several more kilometres. Route 211 now passes just north of Terrenceville, where it has an intersection with Main Drive, which provides access to the town. Route 211 comes to an end shortly thereafter at an intersection with Route 210.

Major intersections

References

211